This page is for the Stone Temple Pilots song. For the Blur song of the same name, see Out of Time (Blur song).

"Out of Time" is a song by American hard rock band Stone Temple Pilots, released as a free download on May 19, 2013 via the band's official website. It is the band's first single not to feature Scott Weiland, and their first song to feature Linkin Park lead singer Chester Bennington. It is the first single, and the introductory track, from the band's debut EP, High Rise, which was released on October 8, 2013 through Play Pen, LLC.

The song was named the official theme song to WWE Hell in a Cell. After this track was released, their second and current single "Black Heart" was launched online on September 17, 2013 through iHeart Radio and digital download. The second track is also featured on High Rise.

History
On May 18, 2013, the three remaining members of Stone Temple Pilots performed together for the first time since firing Scott Weiland on February 27, 2013, appearing as special guests at the 21st Annual KROQ Weenie Roast benefiting Heal the Bay. The band was also announced as a surprise guest for the May 19, 2013 Live 105 BFD festival near San Francisco. At the KROQ Weenie Roast live performance, Bennington surprisingly took the stage with the band, performing original Stone Temple Pilots songs as well as a new song, "Out of Time," which was also released that same day as a free download. It was later announced by Bennington and the band in an exclusive KROQ interview that he was officially the new frontman of Stone Temple Pilots and that they were planning a new album and tour.

The new single was recorded and released via Stone Temple Pilots's official website on May 19, 2013 when Weiland was fired from the band. The updated website shows promotional pictures of Bennington and its remaining members of the band, implying that he will be recording and touring with the band in the near future. The band also made a surprise performance with Bennington as they performed the new song at 21st Annual KROQ Weenie Roast, benefiting Heal the Bay. The single was also released on iHeart Radio later on.

The band was also announced that a new guest would be performing with Stone Temple Pilots at the Live 105 BFD Festival near San Francisco, California on May 19. On the same day, the band released the song via their official website with new updates and promotional photos of the remaining members of the band and Bennington as the band's new lead vocalist, since the firing of Scott Weiland.

Track listing

Charts

Weekly charts

Year-end charts

Personnel 
Band
 Chester Bennington – lead vocals
 Dean DeLeo – guitar
 Robert DeLeo – bass, backing vocals
 Eric Kretz – drums

References

External links
 www.stonetemplepilots.com

2013 singles
Stone Temple Pilots songs